Sirpur Dam, is an earth fill and gravity dam on Bagh river near Deori, Gondia district in the state of Maharashtra in India. The reservoir created by the dam is also known as Bagh reservoir. It is a joint project of Maharashtra and Chhattisgarh states located in Godavari river basin.

Specifications

Purpose
 Irrigation

See also
 Dams in Maharashtra
 List of reservoirs and dams in India

References

Dams in Gondia district
Dams completed in 1970
1970 establishments in Maharashtra
20th-century architecture in India